In cryptography, CJCSG is a stream cypher algorithm developed by Cees Jansen and Alexander Kolosha. It has been submitted to the eSTREAM Project of the eCRYPT network. It has been classified as an archival algorithm and will not be further considered. 

Stream ciphers